Tania Tapsell (born 22 September 1992) is a New Zealand politician. She has served on the Rotorua Lakes District Council since 2013 and was elected mayor of Rotorua at the 2022 local elections. She is the first woman of Māori descent to hold the role.

Early life
Tapsell was born and raised in Rotorua. She attended Rotorua Girls' High School but left at age 16 in order to attend Waiariki Institute of Technology, where she got diplomas in business and marketing. She achieved a Bachelor of Management Studies Degree from the University of Waikato.

Political career
At age 14, Tapsell served on Rotorua's youth council. In 2010, she was selected by Todd McClay to represent the Rotorua electorate at the New Zealand Youth Parliament.

In 2013, Tapsell was elected to the Rotorua Lakes District Council. At 21, she was the youngest councillor ever elected, until the election of 19 year old Fisher Wang in 2019. In 2016 and 2019 she was re-elected as the highest polling candidate. During the 2019 election, Tapsell accused mayoral candidate Reynold MacPherson of hate speech after a Facebook post comparing her to the Pied Piper of Hamelin. The council made a formal complaint to the police, which was criticised by the Free Speech Coalition as a violation of the bill of rights. She voted against the adoption of Māori wards in 2021, arguing that while some councils may need them to ensure representation, Rotorua did not.

Tapsell marched with students during the School Strike for Climate in 2019, however she believes farmers should be excluded from the Zero Carbon Act.

On 6 June 2020, Tapsell was selected as the National Party candidate for the East Coast electorate, having been a member of the party since she was a teen. At the 2020 general election, she failed to retain the seat for National, losing to Labour MP Kiri Allan. She expressed interest in running again at the 2023 New Zealand general election. She was speculated by the media as a possible candidate in the 2022 Tauranga by-election, but declined.

On 10 May 2022, Tapsell announced that she would run for mayor of Rotorua.

Tapsell announced she would name fellow Councillor Sandra Kai Fong as deputy mayor if both are elected to the council in the October local election.

Personal life
Tapsell married Kanin Clancy on 1 December 2020. On 10 March 2023, she announced that they were expecting a baby girl in June. This would make her the first mayor in New Zealand to give birth while in office.

Her iwi are Te Arawa and Ngāti Whakaue, and she has Danish ancestry as a descendent of Phillip Tapsell. She is the great niece of former Labour MP and Speaker of the House Sir Peter Tapsell.

References

1992 births
Living people
People from Rotorua
New Zealand Māori women
Mayors of Rotorua
Māori mayors
Māori politicians
New Zealand National Party politicians
21st-century New Zealand women politicians
Women mayors of places in New Zealand
Unsuccessful candidates in the 2020 New Zealand general election
People educated at Rotorua Girls' High School
University of Waikato alumni
New Zealand Youth MPs
Ngāti Whakaue people
Te Rarawa people
New Zealand people of Danish descent